Eble I (died 1096) was viscount of Ventadour (Corrèze, France).  He married Almodis de Montberon and his children included Eble II of Ventadorn.

1096 deaths
11th-century births
Viscounts of Ventadour
Year of birth missing